Damiana Ligon Eugenio (September 27, 1921 – October 10, 2014) was a Filipino female author and professor who was known as the Mother of Philippine Folklore, a title she received in 1986. Apart from teaching at the University of the Philippines, she has several publications in the field of Philippine folklore, among them a series of seven books which she compiled and edited.

Biography

Education
Eugenio was a BSE degree holder and a cum laude graduate from the University of the Philippines.  She obtained her M.A. degree in English Literature and folklore.  She was a professor at the Department of English and Comparative Literature for the College of Arts in Diliman: Vol. III, The Legends, Philippine Folk Literature, University of the Philippines Press.

Authorship

Description
Eugenio's works were described as volumes that are thorough and professional in presentation and as being valuable resources for scholars studying the
Philippines and comparative folklore.  Written in the English-language, her Philippine Folk Literature: The Myths (1993) served as a compendium that promotes "national and international access to Filipino folklore," were gathered from written sources rather than collected oral variants, and was intended to foster interest in the subject matter.  In this work, Eugenio also presented the collected narratives in a proper scholarly context that also justified the inclusion of the legends of saints, as opposed to being a pure collection of myths.  This particular volume was also described as a recommended work for "any individual interested
in issues of Filipino worldviews and value systems, to any scholar investigating myths across cultures, and to anyone who enjoys the insights that a culture's narratives provide."

Awards and recognitions
Eugenio was the recipient of a lifetime achievement award from the Philippine Board on Books for Young People (PPBY Awards) for her significant contributions to the growth of literacy for children in 1991.<ref name=NCCA>"Damiana L. Eugenio" , Alba, Reinero A. Philippine Board on Books for Young People Awards (PPBY Awards), Nurthuring Children's Literature in the Philippines, InFocub Folklor ng Pilipinas) by the U.P. Folklorists, Inc. and the U.P. Folklore Studies Program in 1986</ref> She also garnered the following recognitions: Most Outstanding Novo Ecijano in the Field of Arts for Literature (Nueva Ecija High School Alumni Association, 1983), Professional Achievement Award in the Humanities for folklore studies (U.P. Alumni Association, 1987), Catholic Mass Media Award: Best Book in English (a finalist, 1987), National Book Award for Literary History (Manila Critic Circle, 1987), Achievement Award in the Humanities (Philippine National Science Society/NCRP, 1989), Cultural Center of the Philippines Award for the Arts for cultural research (Gawad CCP para sa Sining, 1992), Golden Jubilarian Achievement Award (U.P. Education Alumni Association, 1992), National Follower of Balagtas Award (Gawad Pambansang Alagad ni Balagtas, from the Unyon ng mga Manunulat sa Pilipinas or the Philippine Writers Union, UMPIL, 1993), Manila Critics Circle Citation (1995), Centennial Award for Cultural Research (Parangal Sentenyal sa Sining at Kultura'' (Cultural Center of the Philippines, 1999), Most Distinguished Alumna of the Nueva Ecija High School (1999), and the Silver Torch Award (U.P. Educational Alumni Association, 2000).

Death
Eugenio died on October 10, 2014. She had a bad fall in December 2013 and became bed ridden since.

Works:
Philippine Proverb Lore (1975) 
Awit and Korido: A Study of Fifty Philippine Metrical Romances in Relation to Their Sources and Analogues (1965) 
Philippine Folk Literature: An Anthology (1981)
Philippine Folk Literature, (May 31, 2008)

See also
Philippine mythology
Philippine folk literature
Philippine proverbs
E. Arsenio Manuel

References

1921 births
2014 deaths
People from San Miguel, Bulacan
Writers from Bulacan
Filipino women writers
English-language writers from the Philippines
People from Nueva Ecija